ROKS Pohang (PCC-756) was a  of the Republic of Korea Navy. She was decommissioned and now serves as a museum ship in Pohang, South Korea.

Development and design 

The Pohang class is a series of corvettes built by different Korean shipbuilding companies. The class consists of 24 ships and some after decommissioning were sold or given to other countries. There are five different types of designs in the class from Flight II to Flight VI.

Construction and career 
Pohang was launched on 7 February 1984 by Hanjin Heavy Industries in Busan. The vessel was commissioned on 18 December 1984 and decommissioned on 30 June 2009. She now serves as a museum ship in Pohang and in 2010, the  memorial aboard her was opened.

References
 

Ships built by Hanjin Heavy Industries
Pohang-class corvettes
1984 ships
Museum ships in South Korea
Corvettes of the Cold War